Sisana Sisane (born 13 September 1922 in Savannakhet – died November 1998) was a Laotian politician and member of the Lao People's Revolutionary Party (LPRP).

He became a substitute member of the LPRP Central Committee at the 2nd National Congress, and was elected to full membership at the 3rd National Congress and retained a seat on the body until.

References

Specific

Bibliography
Books:
 

1922 births
1998 deaths
Alternate members of the 2nd Central Committee of the Lao People's Revolutionary Party
Members of the 3rd Central Committee of the Lao People's Revolutionary Party
Government ministers of Laos
Lao People's Revolutionary Party politicians
Place of birth missing